is the first single by Japanese recording artist Arisa Mizuki. It was released on May 15, 1991 as the first single from Mizuki's debut studio album Arisa. The title song was written and composed by Amii Ozaki. It was inspired by Anri's "Olivia o Kikinagara," also produced by Ozaki. The song was used in commercials for the Chasse soft drink by Kirin, starring Mizuki herself.

Chart performance 
"Densetsu no Shōjo" debuted on the Oricon Weekly Singles chart at number 5 with 58,150 copies sold in its first week. The single charted for sixteen weeks and has sold a total of 227,340 copies. "Densetsu no Shōjo" was the 12th best-selling single of June 1991 and ranked number 61 on the Oricon Yearly Singles chart.

Track listing

Charts

References 

1991 debut singles
Alisa Mizuki songs
1991 songs